The renal column (or Bertin column, or column of Bertin) is a medullary extension of the renal cortex in between the renal pyramids. It allows the cortex to be better anchored.

Each column consists of lines of blood vessels and urinary tubes and a fibrous material.

A hypertrophied renal column (or renal pseudotumor) may be differentiated from an actual renal tumor with the help of a DMSA scan. The scan will show the area as one with normal activity if it is a pseudotumor or will show decreased uptake if it is a cystic or solid renal mass.

See also
 Renal pyramids
 Renal papilla
 Renal medulla

Additional images

Kidney anatomy